Ahafo Ano South District is a former district that was located in Ashanti Region, Ghana. Originally created as an ordinary district assembly in 1988, which was created from the former Ahafo Ano District Council. However on 15 March 2018, it was split off into two new districts: Ahafo Ano South West District (capital: Mankranso) and Ahafo Ano South East District (capital: Adugyama). The district assembly was located in the western part of Ashanti Region and had Mankranso as its capital town.

Demographics
As of the 2010 Ghana Population Census, Ahafo Ano South had a population of 121,659.

Notable residents
 Hon. Joseph Agyemang Dapaah, District Chief Executive

See also
 Ahafo Ano South West District Assembly Official Website

References

Sources
 
 GhanaDistricts.com

Districts of Ashanti Region